Antiochianus is a surname. Notable people with the surname include:

 Antiochianus, last praetorian prefect of Elegabalus
 Flavius Antiochianus, prominent Roman politician who lived in the Crisis of the Third Century

See also
Antioch
Antiochus (disambiguation)
Antiochis